Monoctanoin (or monocaprylin; trade name Moctanin) is a monoglyceride used to dissolve gallstones consisting of cholesterol. It is not available in the US any more.

The drug was given by injection through a catheter into the bile duct. Its most common adverse effects were abdominal or stomach pain, usually mild, or a burning sensation.

References

Fatty acid esters
Vicinal diols
Octanoate esters